George Placzek (September 26, 1905 – October 9, 1955) was a Moravian physicist.

Biography

Placzek was born into a wealthy Jewish family in Brünn, Moravia (now Brno, Czech Republic), the grandson of Chief Rabbi Baruch Placzek. He studied physics in Prague and Vienna.

In the 1930s, Placzek was known as an adventurous person with sharp sense of humor, a tireless generator of novel physics ideas which he generously shared with his colleagues. The scope of Placzek's pilgrimage around the world's physics centres in the 1930s was unique among his colleagues. He worked with Hans Bethe, Edward Teller, Rudolf Peierls, Werner Heisenberg, Victor Weisskopf, Enrico Fermi, Niels Bohr, Lev Landau, Edoardo Amaldi, Emilio Segrè, Otto Frisch, Leon van Hove, and many other prominent physicists of his time. His wife, Els Placzek was an ex-wife of physicist Hans von Halban. He lost all his relatives to Holocaust, casting a tragic shadow on his life.

Placzek's major areas of scientific work involved a fundamental theory of Raman scattering, molecular spectroscopy in gases and liquids, neutron physics and mathematical physics. Together with Otto Frisch, he suggested a direct experimental proof of nuclear fission. Together with Niels Bohr and others, he was instrumental in clarifying the role of Uranium 235 for the possibility of nuclear chain reaction.

During his stay in Landau's circle in Kharkiv around 1937, Placzek witnessed the brutal reality of Joseph Stalin's regime. His first-hand experience of this influenced the political opinions of his close friends, in particular, fathers of nuclear and thermonuclear bombs, Robert Oppenheimer and Edward Teller.

Later, Placzek was the only Czech with a leading position in the Manhattan project, where he worked from 1943 till 1946 as a member of the British Mission; first in Canada as the leader of a theoretical division at the Montreal Laboratory and then (since May 1945) in Los Alamos, later replacing his friend Hans Bethe as the leader of the theoretical group. Since 1948, Placzek was a member of the Institute for Advanced Study in Princeton, USA.

Unlike many trailblazers of nuclear physics, George Placzek did not leave his recollections or life story notes. Many new facts about Placzek's life and his family roots emerged in connection with a Symposium held in Placzek's memory.
Placzek's premature death in a hotel in Zurich was very likely a suicide influenced by his long-time serious illness.

See also
Placzek transient
Landau–Placzek ratio
Optical theorem
Depolarization ratio

References

1905 births
1955 deaths
1955 suicides
Charles University alumni
Moravian Jews
Czech nuclear physicists
Jewish physicists
Manhattan Project people
People associated with nuclear power
People from the Margraviate of Moravia
Scientists from Brno
Czechoslovak Jews